Fika may refer to:

Fika Emirate, a traditional state in Nigeria
Fika, Nigeria a town and an area in the state of Yobe, in Nigeria

Fika, a Swedish coffee break or light meal